Kittybrewster is an area within Aberdeen, Scotland, north of the city centre and roughly south-west of Old Aberdeen.

Transport

Within the area the A9012 road joins the A978 road; there are also several railway tracks, one of which follows the route of the Aberdeenshire Canal. The name Kittybrewster has been given to three railway stations over the years, including Aberdeen's original main railway station for routes to the north (on the Great North of Scotland Railway). All three stations are now gone, although the route north continues.

Facilities
The area now contains a small number of bars, the Kittybrewster and Woodside Bowling Club, Kittybrewster Primary School, two retail parks (on the sites of former railway yards), a council depot (on the site of one of the old and closed railway stations) and the moderne-styled Northern Hotel.

History
The name first appears  an official document of 1615, although the lands around were known as the Browster lands in 1376; in 1675 it appeared again as "Kettiebrauster". It has a Celtic derivation from Cuitan Briste, meaning "broken fold". (Cuitan, dim. of cuit, fold (modern Gaelic cuidhe); briste, broken.) Usually, folds for cattle had water near them. Kittybrewster was in the den now called Berryden, which means watery (bùrnach) den.

Sir John Arbuthnot, 1st Baronet (1912–92) was born at Powis House, Kittybrewster, and took the name as his territorial designation when he was given a baronetcy in 1964.

See also
 Aberdeen Kittybrewster railway station

References

External links
 , a genealogical site

Areas of Aberdeen